Stowaway in the Sky (French: Le Voyage en ballon) is a 1960 French family adventure film, in Dyaliscope and Eastman Color, directed by Albert Lamorisse.

Albert Lamorisse used his ten-year-old son Pascal as the main character in the film.

Plot
The film tells the story of Pascal, a small child who's fascinated by his grandfather's lighter-than-air balloon. The older man claims he's invented the best mode of transportation: a balloon that can be controlled when in the sky.  The altitude, direction, and speed of the balloon are all under the direction of the pilot.

As the grand-père takes the balloon on a demonstration, Pascal climbs on board and lifts them both upward to an adventure. The balloon travels all around France, Brittany, over the ocean, and over Mont Blanc in the Alps.

However, the balloon turns out to be not so controllable: church spires become objects of threat, factory smokestacks become volcano-like, a stag hunt is no longer about the thrill of the chase, and they inadvertently kidnap washing on a clothesline and a guest at a wedding party in Brittany.

The land-bound adults have conniptions as the balloon wafts by, yet, Pascal has a great time.

Background
Jack Lemmon, the narrator of the film's English version, was so impressed with the film that he bought the American rights.

Cast
 Pascal Lamorisse as Pascal
 Maurice Baquet as Le mécanicien
 André Gille as Le grand-père (grandfather)
 Jack Lemmon as Narrator (English version narrator)

Critical reception
In a brief film review of the film the weekly news magazine Time wrote, "Stowaway in the Sky will enchant moppet, matron and greybeard with its breath-catching, balloonist's-eye view of the fair land of France."<ref>[https://web.archive.org/web/20110219012248/http://www.time.com/time/magazine/article/0,9171,827449,00.html Time], film review, July 13, 1962.</ref>

The Japanese filmmaker Akira Kurosawa cited this movie as one of his 100 favorite films.

Awards
Wins
 Venice Film Festival: OCIC Award; Le Voyage en ballon; 1960.

Nominations
 Venice Film Festival: Golden Lion; Le Voyage en ballon''; 1960.

Footnotes

External links
 
 
 

1960 films
1960 adventure films
French aviation films
1960s French-language films
Films directed by Albert Lamorisse
Balloons (aeronautics)
French adventure films
1960s French films